Darrell George Lester (April 29, 1914 – July 30, 1993) was a two-time All-American center for Texas Christian University in the 1930s.

A native of Jacksboro, Texas, Lester was not only a great football player at TCU.  He earned nine varsity letters in all, also playing center on the Horned Frogs' basketball team and pitching for the baseball team.

It was football, though, where Lester made his mark.  He was the first player in Southwest Conference history to be named consensus All-American twice, earning that honor in both 1934 and 1935.  He is the only Horned Frog to be named a two-time consensus All-American.  He was a captain on the 1935 team, and along with Sammy Baugh led the Frogs to a 12-1 record and a Sugar Bowl victory over LSU.  His successor at center for TCU was Ki Aldrich, who was himself a two-time All-American.

Lester was drafted by the Green Bay Packers and played for them for two seasons before retiring due to an injury. After football, Lester served in the U.S. Army Air Corps in World War II. In the postwar period, he worked for General Mills and was one of the founders of the Bluebonnet Bowl in Houston.  He retired to Temple, Texas. He was elected to the College Football Hall of Fame in 1988 and died in 1993.

References

External links
 

1914 births
1993 deaths
American football centers
Green Bay Packers players
TCU Horned Frogs football players
All-American college football players
College Football Hall of Fame inductees
United States Army personnel of World War II
United States Army Air Forces soldiers
People from Jacksboro, Texas
Players of American football from Texas
People from Temple, Texas